Presidium of the Reichstag (German Empire)

First legislative session 1871-1874

Second legislative session 1874-1877

Third legislative session 1877-1878

Fourth legislative session 1878-1881

Fifth legislative session 1881-1884

Sixth legislative session 1884-1887

Seventh legislative session 1887-1890

Eighth legislative session 1890-1893

Ninth legislative session 1893-1898

Tenth legislative session 1898-1903

See also
Presidium of the Reichstag (Weimar Republic)
Presidium of the Reichstag (Third Reich)

German Empire
Government of the German Empire